was one of 23 escort destroyers of the Tachibana sub-class of the  built for the Imperial Japanese Navy during the final stages of World War II. Completed in February 1945, she finished training in late April, but does not appear to have seen any subsequent use during the war. The ship was surrendered to the Allies at the end of the war and used to repatriate Japanese troops until 1947. Mid-year the destroyer was turned over to the Republic of China and was renamed Hua Yang. The ship ran aground in 1949 and was wrecked; she was not stricken until 1954.

Design and description
The Tachibana sub-class was a simplified version of the preceding  to make them even more suited for mass production. The ships had two Kampon geared steam turbines, each driving one propeller shaft, using steam provided by two Kampon water-tube boilers.

The main armament of the Tachibana sub-class consisted of three Type 89  dual-purpose guns in one twin-gun mount aft and one single mount forward of the superstructure. The single mount was partially protected against spray by a gun shield. The accuracy of the Type 89 guns was severely reduced against aircraft because no high-angle gunnery director was fitted. They carried a total of 25 Type 96  anti-aircraft guns in 4 triple and 13 single mounts. The Tachibanas were equipped with Type 13 early-warning and Type 22 surface-search radars. The ships were also armed with a single rotating quadruple mount amidships for  torpedoes. They could deliver their 60 depth charges via two stern rails and two throwers.

Construction and service 
Tsuta (Ivy) was ordered in Fiscal Year 1943 under the Modified 5th Naval Armaments Supplement Program as part of the Matsu class, but the design was simplified to facilitate production and the ship was one of those built to the modified design. She was laid down on 31 July 1944 by Yokosuka Naval Arsenal, launched on 2 November and completed on 8 February 1945. The ship was assigned to the 11th Destroyer Squadron of the Combined Fleet for working up, and was briefly attached to the Second Fleet on 1–20 April. Tsuta was transferred to Destroyer Division 43 of Escort Squadron 31 of the Combined Fleet on 25 April. Five days later the ship was moored and camouflaged in the Seto Inland Sea. She was turned over to Allied forces at Kure at the time of the surrender of Japan on 2 September and was stricken from the navy list on 5 October.

The destroyer was disarmed and used to repatriate Japanese personnel in 1945–1947. Tsuta was turned over to the Republic of China Navy on 31 July of the latter year and renamed Hua Yang. The ship ran aground in the Pescadores en route to Taiwan in 1949 and remained there until she was stricken from the navy list in 1954.

Notes

Bibliography

 
 

Tachibana-class destroyers
Ships built by Yokosuka Naval Arsenal
1944 ships
World War II destroyers of Japan
Destroyers of the Republic of China Navy